Slava G. Turyshev is a Russian physicist now working in the US at the NASA Jet Propulsion Laboratory (JPL). He is known for his investigations of the Pioneer anomaly, affecting Pioneer 10 and Pioneer 11 spacecraft, and for his attempt to recover early data of the Pioneer spacecraft to shed light on such a phenomenon. He is interested in:   
 Science motivation, mission design, and data analysis of high-precision gravitational experiments in space.
 Relativistic cosmology and alternative theories of gravity; theory of gravity-wave astronomy, including wave generation, propagation and detection.
 Theory of and modeling for high-precision astronomical reference frames; lunar and interplanetary laser ranging; pulsar timing experiments.
 Optimization and control algorithms for long-baseline optical interferometry; analytical and numerical techniques for the white-light fringe parameter estimation.
He was the principal investigator of the LATOR mission aimed at testing parameterized post-Newtonian formalism with high accuracy. Dr. Turyshev chaired several workshops at the International Space Science Institute on the Pioneer anomaly and the flyby anomaly.

In 2020, Slava Turyshev presented his idea of Direct Multi-pixel Imaging and Spectroscopy of an Exoplanet with a Solar Gravitational Lens Mission. The lens could reconstruct the exoplanet image with ~25 km-scale surface resolution in 6 months of integration time, enough to see surface features and signs of habitability.  His proposal was selected for the Phase III of the NASA Innovative Advanced Concepts.  Turyshev proposes to use realistic-sized solar sails (~16 vanes of 10^3 m^2) to achieve the needed high velocity at perihelion (~150 km/sec), reaching 547 AU in 17 years.

Bibliometric information 
As of November 2013, the h index of Turyshev, as released by the NASA ADS database, is 23, with more than 2000 non-self citations.
His tori index and riq index are 25.8 and 267, respectively.

References

External links
NASA webpage on Dr. Turyshev

Russian physicists
Living people
Year of birth missing (living people)